Konstantinos Akratopoulos was a Greek tennis player.  He competed at the 1896 Summer Olympics in Athens.

Akratopoulos had a bye in the first round of the singles tournament.  He met Dionysios Kasdaglis of Greece in the second round, losing to the eventual silver medallist.  Akratopoulos finished in a three-way tie for fifth place.

In the doubles tournament, Akratopoulos partnered with his brother Aristidis.  The pair was defeated in the first round by eventual gold medallists Friedrich Traun of Germany and John Pius Boland of Great Britain and Ireland.  They finished in a two-way tie for fourth place among the five pairs.

References

External links

Year of birth missing
Year of death missing
19th-century Greek people
19th-century male tennis players
Greek male tennis players
Olympic tennis players of Greece
Tennis players at the 1896 Summer Olympics
Place of birth missing
Place of death missing